Danilovo is an air base in Mari El Republic, Russia located 11 km east of Yoshkar-Ola. It was a small interceptor aircraft airfield, now used by a Helicopter Squadron of the Missile forces.

The base is currently home to the 108th independent Helicopter Squadron of the 14th Kievsko-Zhitomirskaya order of Kutuzov Missile Division of the 27th Guards Vitebskaya Red Banner Missile Army.

The base was home to the 681st Fighter Aviation Regiment PVO between 1952 and 1994.

References

Soviet Air Force bases
Soviet Air Defence Force bases
Airports in Mari El
Strategic Rocket Forces